Afadin- and alpha-actinin-binding protein is a protein that in humans is encoded by the SSX2IP gene. It has been shown that it functions together with WDR8 in centrosome maturation, ensuring proper spindle length and orientation. The SSX2IP-WDR8 complex additionally promotes ciliary vesicle docking during ciliogenesis.

Interactions 

SSX2IP has been initially described as a protein to interact with MLLT4 and Actinin, alpha 1. In the context of centrosome maturation and ciliogenesis it has been shown to interact with WDR8.

References

Further reading